Liptena undina is a butterfly in the family Lycaenidae. It is found in Cameroon, Gabon, the Republic of the Congo, the Democratic Republic of the Congo (Uele, Equateur and Sankuru), Uganda and north-western Tanzania. The habitat consists of forests.

The larvae are associated with ants and will not feed in captivity. They are small, regularly formed, dark sepia and hairy.

References

Butterflies described in 1894
Liptena
Taxa named by Henley Grose-Smith
Taxa named by William Forsell Kirby
Butterflies of Africa